Wait Until Spring, Bandini is a novel by American author John Fante. Released in 1938, it was his first published novel; The Road to Los Angeles, written in 1936, was discovered after Fante has died and was released posthumously in 1985. The book is set in a small-town in Colorado and tells the story of the Bandini family during a winter in the Great Depression. It is the first book in the Bandini Quartet, a semi-autobiographical series of books about Arturo Bandini, the son of Italian immigrants to the United States. The novel was adapted into a 1989 film of the same name starring Joe Mantegna as Svevo Bandini, Ornella Muti as Maria Bandini, and Faye Dunaway as Mrs. Hildegarde.

References

1938 American novels
American novels adapted into films
Italian-American novels
Novels set in Colorado
Novels about writers
Novels by John Fante
Roman à clef novels